Acacia implexa, commonly known as lightwood or hickory wattle, is a fast-growing Australian tree, the timber of which is used for furniture making. The wood is prized for its finish and strength. The foliage was used to make pulp and dye cloth.

Description
The tree can have a single or multiple stems with rough greyish bark. The branchlets are commonly lightly covered in waxy bloom but are not prominently ribbed. Bipinnate leaves may persist on some plants. Young foliage have a purple colour in certain conditions. It blooms in summer and produces spherical cream coloured flowers with a strong perfume.

Dust from the pods can irritate the eyes and nose.
It has wood similar to and is often mistaken with Acacia melanoxylon.

Taxonomy and naming
The species was first formally described by the botanist George Bentham in 1842 as part of the work Notes on Mimoseae, with a synopsis of species as published in the London Journal of Botany. It was reclassified as Racosperma implexum by Leslie Pedley in 1987 and transferred back into its original genus in 2006. The only other synonym is Acacia implexa var. implexa.

The Wiradjuri people of New South Wales use the name Gidya.

Distribution
It is widespread in eastern Australia from central coastal Queensland to southern Victoria, with outlying populations on the Atherton Tableland in northern Queensland and Tasmania's King Island.
The tree is commonly found on fertile plains and in hilly country it is usually part of open forest communities and grows in shallow drier sandy and clay soils.

Aboriginal uses
The Ngunnawal people of the ACT used the bark to make rope, string, medicine and for fish poison, the timber for tools, and the seeds to make flour.  The Dharawal people used the flowering of Acacia implexa as a seasonal indicator that fires should not be lit unless they are on sand, and camping near creeks and rivers is avoided during this time. The Wiradjuri people of New South Wales use the seeds to make flour, and the bark as a medicine, and to make fish poison.

Cultivation
The species is very hardy and suitable for soil stabilization and bank planting, as a result of the plants suckering habit which can be accelerated if the roots are damaged. 
It is very prone to leaf gall.

See also
 List of Acacia species

References

Trees of Australia
implexa
Fabales of Australia
Flora of Victoria (Australia)
Flora of New South Wales
Flora of Queensland
Flora of Tasmania
Plants described in 1842
Taxa named by George Bentham